Santa Catarina River may refer to:

Santa Catarina River (Minas Gerais), Brazil
Santa Catarina River (Rio de Janeiro), Brazil
Santa Catarina River (Mexico), in Monterrey, Nuevo León, Mexico